February 17 - Eastern Orthodox liturgical calendar - February 19

All fixed commemorations below are observed on March 3  (March 2 on leap years) by Eastern Orthodox Churches on the Old Calendar.

For February 18th, Orthodox Churches on the Old Calendar commemorate the Saints listed on February 5.

Saints

 Martyrs Leo and Parigorius of Patara in Lycia (c. 258)
 Venerable Agapitus the Confessor and Wonderworker, Bishop of Synnada in Phrygia (c. 308-324)
 Martyrs Victor, Dorotheus, Theodoulus, and Agrippa, at Synnada in Phrygia Salutaris, who suffered under Licinius (c. 308-324)
 Martyr Piulius (Publius), by the sword.
 Saint Flavian the Confessor, Archbishop of Constantinople (c. 449)  (see also: February 16)
 Saint Leo the Great, Pope of Rome (461)  (see also: November 10 - West)
 Saint Blaise of Amorion and Mt. Athos (c. 908)

Pre-Schism Western saints

 Saints Maximus, Claudius, Praepedigna, Alexander and Cutias, martyrs in Rome who suffered under Diocletian (295)  (see also: August 11)
 Saints Lucius, Silvanus, Rutulus, Classicus, Secundinus, Fructulus and Maximus, martyrs in North Africa.
 Saint Helladius of Toledo, Archbishop of Toledo and Confessor (632)
 Saint Colman of Lindisfarne, Bishop of Lindisfarne and Confessor (676)
 Saint Ethelina (Eudelme), the patroness of Little Sodbury, now in Gloucestershire in England.
 Saint Angilbert, Abbot of St. Riquier in the north of France where there were some 300 monks (c. 740-814)

Post-Schism Orthodox saints

 Venerable Cosmas, founder of Yakhromsk Monastery (ru), Vladimir (1492)
 Saint Nicholas V of Georgia, Catholicos of Georgia (1591)

New martyrs and confessors

 New Hieromartyr Alexander Medvedsky, Priest (1932)
 New Hiero-confessor Vladimir (Terentiev), Abbot, of Zosima Hermitage (1933)
 New Hieromartyr Benjamin, Hieromonk (1938)
 Virgin-martyr Anna (1940)

Other commemorations

 Commemoration of the New Martyrs who suffered during the "Holy Night" in St. Petersburg (1932)
 Finding of the relics (1961) of New Martyr Irene of Mytilene (1463)  (see also: May 12 - Greek)

 Repose of Schema-monk Constantine (Cavarnos), spiritual writer (2011)

Icon gallery

Notes

References

Sources
 February 18 / March 3. Orthodox Calendar (Pravoslavie.ru).
 March 3 / February 18. Holy Trinity Russian Orthodox Church (A parish of the Patriarchate of Moscow).
 February 18. OCA - The Lives of the Saints.
 The Autonomous Orthodox Metropolia of Western Europe and the Americas. St. Hilarion Calendar of Saints for the year of our Lord 2004. St. Hilarion Press (Austin, TX). p. 16.
 The Eighteenth Day of the Month of February. Orthodoxy in China.
 February 18. Latin Saints of the Orthodox Patriarchate of Rome.
 The Roman Martyrology. Transl. by the Archbishop of Baltimore. Last Edition, According to the Copy Printed at Rome in 1914. Revised Edition, with the Imprimatur of His Eminence Cardinal Gibbons. Baltimore: John Murphy Company, 1916. pp. 51-52.
 Rev. Richard Stanton. A Menology of England and Wales, or, Brief Memorials of the Ancient British and English Saints Arranged According to the Calendar, Together with the Martyrs of the 16th and 17th Centuries. London: Burns & Oates, 1892. pp. 74-78.
Greek Sources
 Great Synaxaristes:  18 Φεβρουαρίου. Μεγασ Συναξαριστησ.
  Συναξαριστής. 18 Φεβρουαρίου. Ecclesia.gr. (H Εκκλησια Τησ Ελλαδοσ). 
Russian Sources
  3 марта (18 февраля). Православная Энциклопедия под редакцией Патриарха Московского и всея Руси Кирилла (электронная версия). (Orthodox Encyclopedia - Pravenc.ru).
  18 февраля (ст.ст.) 3 марта 2014 (нов. ст.). Русская Православная Церковь Отдел внешних церковных связей. (Decr).

February in the Eastern Orthodox calendar